Lucy the Elephant is a six-story elephant-shaped example of novelty architecture, constructed of wood and tin sheeting in 1881 by James V. Lafferty in Margate City, New Jersey, approximately five miles (8 km) south of Atlantic City. Originally named Elephant Bazaar, Lucy was built to promote real estate sales and attract tourists. Today, Lucy is the oldest surviving roadside tourist attraction in America.

History

1881–1899

Patenting and construction

In 1881, the U.S. Patent Office granted James V. Lafferty a patent giving him the exclusive right to make, use or sell animal-shaped buildings for a duration of seventeen years. Lafferty funded the design and construction of his first elephant-shaped building at South Atlantic City, now called Margate. He employed Philadelphia architects William Free and J. Mason Kirby for the design. Lucy was modeled after Jumbo, the famous elephant with Barnum and Bailey's Greatest Show on Earth, and constructed at a cost of $25,000 - $38,000.

Initially named "Elephant Bazaar", the structure stands at 65 feet (19.7 m) in height, 60 feet (18.3 m) in length, and 18 feet (5.5 m) in width and weighs about 90 tons. It is listed as the 12th tallest statue in the United States. Lucy was constructed with nearly one million pieces of wood, and required 200 kegs of nails, 4 tons of bolts and iron bars; 12,000 square feet of tin covers the exterior.  There are 22 windows placed throughout the structure.

Early use and sale

Originally, Lafferty brought potential real estate customers to view parcels of land from Lucy's howdah (carriage). The howdah offers unique views of Margate, Atlantic City's skyline, the beach, and the Atlantic Ocean and it serves as an observation deck for modern day visitors during tours.

The structure was sold to Anton Gertzen of Philadelphia in 1887 and remained in his family until 1970. Anton's daughter-in-law, Sophia Gertzen, reportedly dubbed the structure "Lucy the Elephant" in 1902. The shape of Lucy's head is characteristic of an Asian Elephant, and male elephants have tusks. Initially, the elephant was referred to as a male, but eventually became commonly known as a female.

1900–1999 

Through the first half of the 20th century, Lucy served as a restaurant, business office, cottage, and tavern (the last closed by Prohibition). The building was depicted on many souvenir postcards, often referred to as "The Elephant Hotel of Atlantic City." (The actual hotel was in a nearby building, not inside the elephant.)

By the 1960s, Lucy had fallen into disrepair and was scheduled for demolition. In 1969, Edwin T. Carpenter and a group of Margate citizens formed the Margate Civic Association, which later became the Save Lucy Committee under Josephine Harron and Sylvia Carpenter. They were given a 30-day deadline to move the edifice or pay for its demolition.  Various fund-raising events, the most successful a door-to-door canvass by volunteers, raised money.

On July 20, 1970, Lucy was moved about 100 yards to the west-southwest to a city owned lot and completely refurbished. It took about seven hours to move Lucy to her new location but she remained closed to visitors until 1974 when structural repairs and upgrades were complete. The building's original wooden frame was buttressed with new steel, and the deteriorated howdah was replaced with a replica. A plug of green glass set into the howdah platform refracts light into Lucy's interior.

In 1976, Lucy was designated a National Historic Landmark, during the United States Bicentennial celebration.

2000–present 

Every July 20, the building's birthday is celebrated with children's games and much fanfare.

In 2006, Lucy was struck by lightning, blackening the tips of the tusks. In October 2012, Hurricane Sandy made landfall near Margate. Lucy remained unscathed, although the surge reached the building's toes and a small booth in the parking lot was blown over.

On July 23, 2016, Lucy's staff announced the building's fake candidacy for President of the United States at a celebration for her 135th birthday. In 2016, Lucy had 135,000 visitors at the site, 35,000 of whom took the guided tour.

On February 27, 2020, Lucy began allowing overnight stays. Lucy was listed on Airbnb for $138 per night on March 17, 18 and 19, 2020. It marked the first time Lucy had been inhabited by humans since it was rented as a home in the early 1900s.

Inspections in 2021 revealed that more than half of Lucy's metal skin had degraded beyond repair and needed to be replaced. Upon receiving a $500,000 grant from the National Park Service in August 2021, the Save Lucy Committee announced a plan to repair Lucy and replace the faulty metal exterior skin. Lucy temporarily closed on September 20, 2021. The project was partially funded by a grant from the Preserve New Jersey Preservation Fund administered by the New Jersey Historic Trust. During restorations, a weatherproof scaffolding was built around Lucy. The original target was for an eight-month project and to reopen Memorial Day 2022.  After delays pushed the reopening date back some, Lucy the Elephant fully reopened to the public after 15 months on December 28, 2022.  The overall cost of the restoration was $2.4 million; a mixture of inflation and supply chain problems had increased the cost from the initial projections.

Other structures by Lafferty

Elephantine Colossus (1885–1896) 

The Elephantine Colossus or Elephant Hotel, at Coney Island amusement park in Brooklyn, New York, stood 122 feet (37.2 m) tall, approximately twice the size of Lucy, with seven floors of rooms, and legs 60 feet in circumference. With the exception of the number and relative size of the windows, and the design of the howdah, its exterior was a nearly exact scaled-up replication of Lucy. It held a cigar store in one leg and a diorama in another, hotel rooms within the elephant proper, and an observation area at the top with panoramic sea views. It burned down in 1896.

Light of Asia (1884–1900) 

Light of Asia (dubbed Old Jumbo by locals) opened in Cape May in 1884, and was a slightly smaller version of Lucy. It was not successful and was torn down within 16 years. Lafferty was not directly involved with the construction but granted patent rights to Theodore M. Rieger, a real estate developer like himself, who sought to do for Cape May what Lafferty did with Lucy for Atlantic City It is unclear whether the Light of Asia matched the quality of the other buildings; the only known surviving photo of Light of Asia appears to have been taken while still under construction with no metal skin and an incomplete head, and with yet another different howdah design. A video presented to visitors inside Lucy in 2009 includes that same photo with the narration describing it as Cape May's "inferior rendition" of Lucy.

Prospectus for 1893 World's Columbian Exposition  

A prospectus was published in 1892 by Kirby (while Lafferty still owned the patent) for a fourth building, even larger than Elephantine Colossus and with a moving trunk, eyeballs, ears and tail as well as a Calliope in the throat, to be built for the 1893 World's Columbian Exposition in Chicago. No actual construction was ever attempted.

In popular culture

Movies 
 In 1972, Lucy appeared in the movie The King of Marvin Gardens, starring Jack Nicholson and Bruce Dern.
 In 1980, Lucy can be briefly seen in the opening of the Oscar nominated film, Atlantic City, starring Burt Lancaster and Susan Sarandon.
 In 1983, Lucy is shown on a postcard with a picture in the opening credits of the film, National Lampoon's Vacation.
 An ice cream shop with a living area above shaped like Lucy appears in the 1991 Disney film The Rocketeer, although the film takes place in Southern California.
 The Jardin the Paris Elephant, a real-life large elephant structure inspired by “Elephantine Colossus”, (a larger version of Lucy, built by Lafferty in 1885 on Coney Island), is featured as the location of the boudoir of Nicole Kidman's character in the 2001 film Moulin Rouge!
In 2015, Lucy was featured in the opening credits of the film Vacation, similar to the original 1983 film, National Lampoon's Vacation.

Television 
 In 1979, Lucy appeared in the intro to the short-lived CBS drama series Big Shamus, Little Shamus which takes place in Atlantic City.
In 1986, Lucy appeared on an episode of Mister Rogers' Neighborhood, in which Fred Rogers took a short tour of Lucy.
In November 2006, the building was prominently featured in an advertisement for Proformance Insurance.
In 2006, the History Channel television series Weird U.S. featured Lucy in an episode.
 In 2009, Lucy was featured in an episode of Life After People, which illustrated how the environment would take over the structure without people to maintain Lucy.
 In a 2011 episode of Boardwalk Empire, Agent Van Alden mentions "a hotel shaped like an elephant" among the local attractions. Lucy is also briefly seen in the second-season episode "Gimcrack & Bunkum".
 On April 2, 2014, Lucy appeared in a clip on an episode of Strange Inheritance, which mainly featured the World's tallest thermometer, another well-known roadside attraction.
 On June 14, 2014, The Travel Channel's Monumental Mysteries featured Lucy the Elephant in an episode.
 The 2017 movie The Dunning Man shows footage of the effort to preserve the building.
In 2021, Lucy appeared in an episode of the PBS series Drive By History which explored her cultural significance in American history.

Books/Print 

 2012: Lucy was featured in the book, Stay Close by Harlan Coben.
 April 18, 2015: Lucy was featured in the Bill Griffith daily comic strip "Zippy the Pinhead".
 July, 2022: 'Big Potato Games''' announced that Lucy will be among 49 popular national roadside attractions featured in "Zillionaires: Road Trip USA''", its new Monopoly style family board game.

See also
Cultural depictions of elephants
Elephant of the Bastille
Charles Ribart and his plan for the site of L'Arc de Triomphe
National Register of Historic Places listings in Atlantic County, New Jersey
Tillie, another colorful icon of the Jersey Shore

References

External links

Lucy the Elephant - Official website
Roadside America
Life after People (2009)
The Travel Channel's Monumental Mysteries featuring Lucy 
HD Video taken 07 Aug 2009

Weird NJ Visits Lucy the Elephant (2007)
"House Built Like Elephant Contains Six Rooms", December 1932, Popular Mechanics

Commercial buildings completed in 1881
Novelty buildings in New Jersey
Roadside attractions in New Jersey
National Historic Landmarks in New Jersey
Tourist attractions in Atlantic County, New Jersey
Historic American Buildings Survey in New Jersey
National Register of Historic Places in Atlantic County, New Jersey
Margate City, New Jersey
Elephants in art
New Jersey Register of Historic Places
1881 establishments in New Jersey
Landmarks in New Jersey